Daniel Bezziccheri (born 21 January 1998) is an Italian football player. He plays for  club Latina.

Club career
He made his Serie C debut for Reggina on 26 August 2017 in a game against Rende.

On 25 July 2019, he joined Viterbese.

On 11 August 2022, Bezziccheri signed with Chiasso in Switzerland.

On 31 January 2023, Bezziccheri moved to Serie C club Latina.

References

External links

1998 births
Footballers from Rome
Living people
Italian footballers
Association football forwards
Italy youth international footballers
Reggina 1914 players
Albissola 2010 players
U.S. Viterbese 1908 players
S.S.D. Pro Sesto players
FC Chiasso players
Latina Calcio 1932 players
Serie C players
Swiss Promotion League players
Italian expatriate footballers
Expatriate footballers in Switzerland
Italian expatriate sportspeople in Switzerland